Denholm Group is a British maritime company based in Glasgow, United Kingdom. It was founded by John Denholm of Greenock in 1866 and today has an annual turnover of over £250 million. It employs over 3,000 people around the world.

Marine Services
Marine Services is a joint venture between Denholm Group and Serco to provide to support the United Kingdoms Naval Service. Marine Services is responsible for fleet support at the three main UK naval bases, HMNB Portsmouth, HMNB Devonport and HMNB Clyde.

References

Shipping companies of Scotland
Companies based in Glasgow